The Fernand Léger Museum, is a French national museum in Biot, Alpes-Maritimes, in south-eastern France. It is dedicated to the work of the twentieth-century artist Fernand Léger. Although originally privately owned, it is now a state museum entitled to style itself Musée de France.

History
In 1955, Fernand Léger bought a villa in Biot, called Mas Saint-André, with the intention of installing polychrome ceramic sculptures in his garden, but died soon afterwards. Construction began in 1957, and the museum opened in 1960. The gardens were designed by Henri Fish and contain sculptures based on Léger's work.

References

National museums of France
Modern art museums in France
Art museums and galleries in France
Museums in Alpes-Maritimes
Museums established in 1960